Judith Skillman (born 1954) is a contemporary northwest American poet and the author of eighteen books of verse.  She is the winner of many poetry awards, including the Eric Mathieu King Fund from the Academy of American Poets, and has received grants from the Centrum Foundation, King County Arts Commission, and the Washington State Arts Commission, and Artist Trust.  Skillman is also a translator from the French, most notably of the poet Anne-Marie Derese.

She has had 26 poems published in the Journal of the American Medical Association (JAMA). In addition her work has appeared in Poetry, Shenandoah, The Southern Review, Prairie Schooner, Cimarron Review, and many other journals. Anthologies include Nasty Women Poets, Lost Horse Press, 2017.
Currently Skillman resides in Seattle. She  has dual citizenship with Canada. Skillman also does visual art using oil paints. See www.judithskillman.com for a link to publications and artwork.

In 2013 Skillman published a book on the creative and practical processes of writing poetry, Broken Lines - The Art & Craft of Poetry. It is targeted at poets who would like to put together a first or second manuscript of poetry.

Books
Came Home to Winter (Deerbrook Editions, 2019
Premise of Light (Tebot Bach), 2018)
Kafka's Shadow (Deerbrook Editions, 2017)
House of Burnt Offerings (Pleasure Boat Studio, 2015)
Angles of Separation (Glass Lyre Press, 2014)
The Phoenix:  New & Selected Poems  2007 – 2013 (Dream Horse Press, 2013)
Broken Lines - The Art & Craft of Poetry (Lummox Press, 2013)
White Cypress (Červená Barva Press, 2011)
The Never (Dream Horse Press, 2010)
Prisoner of the Swifts (Ahadada Books, 2007)
Heat Lightning; Selected Poems (Silverfish Review Press, 2006).
Coppelia; Certain Digressions (David Robert, 2006).
Opalescence (David Robert, 2005).
Latticework (David Robert, 2004).
Circe's Island (Silverfish Review Press, 2003).
Sweetbrier (Blue Begonia, 2001).
Red Town (Silverfish Review Press, 2001).
Storm (Blue Begonia, 1998).
Beethoven and the Birds (Blue Begonia, 1996).
Worship of the Visible Spectrum (Breitenbush Books, 1986).

References

External links
Judith Skillman Official Website
Glass Lyre Press Official Website

1954 births
Living people
American women poets
20th-century American poets
20th-century American women writers
21st-century American women